Walter Schroeder (May 19, 1878 – July 18, 1967) was a Wisconsin hotel and insurance magnate.

Early life
Schroeder's formal education ended with the eighth grade and he began working at age 14 as a clerk in the Office of the Milwaukee Register of Deeds. There he learned about mortgages, deeds, and other legal instruments related to real estate. Shortly after beginning work at the deed office, Schroeder also began working as a staff member of the Milwaukee Daily Reporter. Schroeder began his own paper only two years later, the Daily Abstractor, captured most of the Reporter'''s readers, and then bought out the Reporter.''

Hotelier
In Chris. Schroeder & Son was asked to refinance a bond issue for the Wisconsin Hotel, the largest hotel in the state at that time. Schroeder saw that the hotel industry lacked competent management skills, and so decided to enter the hotel business.

In the 1920s Schroeder opened the:

 Schroeder Hotel, now the Hilton Milwaukee City Center, a 25-story landmark at 5th and Wisconsin Avenue in Milwaukee, Wisconsin
 Astor Hotel (now the Astor on the Lake) in Milwaukee
 Hotel Northland in Green Bay, Wisconsin
 The Hotel Loraine on Capitol Square in Madison, Wisconsin - now The Loraine Condominiums
 Retlaw Hotel (Ramada Plaza Hotel) in Fond du Lac, Wisconsin - now the Hotel Retlaw 
 Wausau Hotel in Wausau, Wisconsin - now The Landmark apartments
 Duluth Hotel in Duluth, Minnesota

He also acquired the:
 Calumet Hotel in Fond du Lac
 Vincent Hotel in Benton Harbor, Michigan

Legacy
Schroeder was a generous philanthropist. His foundation provided a $3 million grant to help fund the Milwaukee School of Engineering's Walter Schroeder Library in 1978. Other facilities named after Schroeder include the Walter Schroeder Lounge at the Humphrey Scottish Rite Masonic Center, and the Olympic-size Walter Schroeder Aquatic Center of the Metro Milwaukee YMCA. He was also a benefactor of Marquette University.

Ghost
Schroeder's ghost is said to haunt the Hotel Retlaw in Fond du Lac, the Aquatic Center, and the Schroeder Hall.

References

1878 births
1967 deaths
American hoteliers
Insurance agents
American financial businesspeople
Businesspeople from Milwaukee